Derrick is both a masculine given name and a surname. It is a variant of Theodoric. People with the name include:

People with the given name "Derrick" include

A
Derrick Abu (born 2003), German footballer
Derrick Adams (born 1970), American visual artist
Derrick Adkins (born 1970), American Olympic hurdler
Derrick Alexander (disambiguation), multiple people
Derrick Allen (born 1980), American basketball player and coach
Derrick Alston (born 1972), American basketball player
Derrick Alston Jr. (born 1997), American basketball player
Derrick America, South African politician
Derrick Anderson (born 1966), Guamanian judoka
Derrick Anderson (field hockey) (born 1936), Canadian field hockey player
Derrick Ansley (born 1981), American football coach
Derrick Mensah Antwi (born 2004), Ghanaian footballer
Derrick Appiah (born 1994), Italian rugby union footballer
Derrick Ashihundu (born 1998), Kenyan rugby union footballer
Derrick Ashong (born 1975), Ghanaian producer and musician
Derrick Atkins (born 1984), Bahamian sprinter
Derrick Atterberry (born 1972), American football player

B
Derrick Bailey (1918–2009), British pilot
Derrick Sherwin Bailey (1910–1984), English theologian
Derrick Barnes (disambiguation), multiple people
Derrick Barry (born 1983), American drag performer
Derrick Barton (1923–2006), British tennis player
Derrick Baskin (born 1975), American actor
Derrick Baxby (1940–2017), British microbiologist
Derrick Beckles, Canadian writer and actor
Derrick Bell (1930–2011), American lawyer and civil rights activist
Derrick Bishop (born 1983), Barbadian cricketer
Derrick Blaylock (born 1979), American football player
Derrick Borte (born 1967), German-American filmmaker
Derrick Bostrom (born 1960), American musician
Derrick Bragg, Canadian politician
Derrick Branche (born 1947), British actor
Derrick Brangman (born 1987), Bermudian cricketer
Derrick Drop Braxton (born 1981), American record producer
Derrick Brew (born 1977), American track athlete
Derrick Brooks (born 1973), American football player
Derrick Brown (disambiguation), multiple people
Derrick Bryant (born 1974), American basketball player
Derrick Burgess (born 1978), American football player
Derrick Burgess (politician), Bermudian politician
Derrick Burroughs (born 1962), American football player and coach
Derrick Byars (born 1984), American basketball player

C
Derrick Cameron, American comedian
Derrick Campbell (born 1972), Canadian speed skater
Derrick Capper (1912–1977), English police officer
Derrick Caracter (born 1988), American basketball player
Derrick Carter (born 1969), American record producer and musician
Derrick Carter (footballer) (born 1982), Guyanese footballer
Derrick Cawthorne (born 1931), British fencer
Derrick H.M. Chan (born 1955), American judge
Derrick Chievous (born 1967), American basketball player
Derrick Childs (1918–1987), Welsh bishop
Derrick Christie (born 1957), English footballer
Derrick Clark (disambiguation), multiple people
Derrick Coleman (born 1967), American basketball player
Derrick Coleman (American football) (born 1990), American football player
Derrick Cooper (born 1955), English golfer
Derrick Crass (born 1960), American weightlifter
Derrick Crawford (disambiguation), multiple people
Derrick Crudup (born 1965), American football player
Derrick Cullors (born 1972), American football player
Derrick Curtis, American politician

D
Derrick Dalley (born 1965), Canadian politician
Derrick Davenport (born 1978), American model
Derrick Deese (born 1970), American football player
Derrick Deese Jr. (born 1998), American football player
Derrick de Kerckhove (born 1944), Canadian professor
Derrick Delmore (born 1978), American figure skater
Derrick De Marney (1906–1978), English actor
Derrick Dial (born 1975), American basketball player
Derrick Dillon (born 1995), American football player
Derrick Dockery (born 1980), American football player
Derrick Dodd, American writer
Derrick Doggett (born 1984), American football player
Derrick Douglas (born 1968), American football player
Derrick Dowell (born 1965), American basketball player
Derrick Downing (born 1945), English footballer
Derrick Dukes (born 1965), American professional wrestler

E
Derrick Edwards (born 1968), Antiguan footballer
Derrick Etienne (born 1996), Haitian-American footballer
Derrick Etienne (footballer, born 1974) (born 1974), Haitian footballer
Derrick Evans (disambiguation), multiple people

F
Derrick Faison (1967–2004), American football player
Derrick Favors (born 1991), American basketball player
Derrick Fenner (born 1967), American football player
Derrick Fletcher (born 1975), American football player
Derrick Flint (1924–2018), English cricketer
Derrick Florence (born 1968), American sprinter
Derrick Ford (born 1979), American football player
Derrick Frazier (born 1970), American football player
Derrick Frost (born 1980), American football player
Derrick Fung (born 1987), Canadian entrepreneur and foreign exchange trader

G
Derrick Gaffney (born 1955), American football player
Derrick Gainer (born 1972), American boxer
Derrick Gainer (American football) (born 1966), American football player
Derrick Gardner (born 1965), American jazz trumpeter
Derrick Gardner (American football) (born 1977), American football player
Derrick Gervin (born 1963), American basketball player
Derrick Gibson (disambiguation), multiple people
Derrick Goh (born 1968), Singaporean politician
Derrick Goodwin (1935–2022), English theatre and television director
Derrick Goold (born 1975), American author and sportswriter
Derrick Gordon (born 1991), American basketball player
Derrick Gore (born 1994), American football player
Derrick Gosselin (born 1956), Belgian engineer and economist
Derrick Gragg (born 1969), American college athletics administrator
Derrick Graham (disambiguation), multiple people
Derrick Grant (born 1938), Scottish rugby union footballer
Derrick Gray (born 1985), American football player
Derrick Green (born 1971), American musician
Derrick Green (American football) (born 1994), American football player
Derrick Gregory (1949–1989), English drug smuggler
Derrick Griffin (born 1993), American basketball player
Derrick Gunston (1891–1985), British politician

H
Derrick Hall (born 1969), American sports executive
Derrick Hall (cricketer) (1892–1947), Irish cricketer
Derrick Ham (born 1975), American football player
Derrick Hamilton (born 1981), American football player
Derrick Hamilton (basketball) (born 1966), American basketball player
Derrick Harden (born 1964), American football player
Derrick Harmon (born 1963), American football player
Derrick Harriott (born 1939), Jamaican singer and record producer
Derrick Harris (born 1972), American football player
Derrick Harris (musician) (??–2019), American musician
Derrick Harrison (1929–1967), English rugby league footballer
Derrick Harvey (born 1986), American football player
Derrick Helton (born 1985), American Paralympic rugby footballer
Derrick Henry (born 1994), American football player
Derrick Hodge (born 1979), American composer and musician
Derrick Hoh (born 1985), Singaporean singer-songwriter
Derrick Hoskins (born 1970), American football player
Derrick Hyman, South African Paralympian

J
Derrick Z. Jackson (born 1955), African-American journalist
Derrick Jackson (politician) (born 1966), American politician
Derrick James (born 1972), American boxer
Derrick Jasper (born 1988), American basketball player
Derrick Jefferson (born 1968), American boxer
Derrick Jensen (born 1960), American author and environmental activist
Derrick Jensen (American football) (1956–2017), American football player
Derrick Johnson (disambiguation), multiple people
Derrick Jones (disambiguation), multiple people

K
Derrick Kabwe (born 1983), Zambian footballer
Derrick Kakooza (born 2002), Ugandan footballer
Derrick Kellier (born 1947), Jamaican businessman and politician
Derrick Kelly II (born 1995), American football player
Derrick Kennedy (1904–1976), Irish cricketer
Derrick Kent, British naval officer
Derrick Kimball (born 1954), Canadian lawyer
Derrick Kindred (born 1993), American football player
Derrick Kitts (born 1973), American politician
Derrick Knowles (born 1966), Bahamian hurdler
Derrick Köhn (born 1999), German footballer
Derrick Krantz (born 1988), American professional mixed martial artist

L
Derrick Lancaster (born 1973), American stock car racing driver
Derrick Lassic (born 1970), American football player
Derrick Lee (disambiguation), multiple people
Derrick Lehmer (disambiguation), multiple people
Derrick Lente, American politician
Derrick Leon (1908–1944), British author
Derrick Levasseur (born 1984), American television personality
Derrick Lewis (disambiguation), multiple people
Derrick Locke (born 1989), American football player
Derrick Lonsdale (born 1924), English pediatrician and researcher
Derrick Lott (born 1990), American football player
Derrick Low (born 1986), American basketball player
Derrick Luckassen (born 1995), Dutch footballer
Derrick Lythgoe (1933–2012), English footballer

M
Derrick Somerset Macnutt (1902–1971), British crossword compiler
Derrick Marks (born 1993), American basketball player
Derrick Martin (born 1985), American football player
Derrick Mason (born 1974), American football player
Derrick Mathews (born 1992), American football player
Derrick May (disambiguation), multiple people
Derrick Mayes (born 1974), American football player
Derrick McAdoo (born 1965), American football player
Derrick McDicken (born 1955), Scottish footballer
Derrick McKey (born 1966), American basketball player
Derrick McKoy (born 1951), Jamaican politician
Derrick Mehmen (born 1985), American mixed martial artist
Derrick Mein (born 1985), American sports shooter
Derrick Mensah (born 1995), Ghanaian footballer
Derrick Mensah (footballer, born 2003) (born 2003), Ghanaian footballer
Derrick Mercer (born 1986), American basketball player
Derrick Mgwebi (born 1956), South African military commander
Derrick Miller, American army officer
Derrick Mokaleng (born 1997), South African sprinter
Derrick Monasterio (born 1995), Filipino actor and singer
Derrick Moncrief (born 1993), American football player
Derrick Moore (born 1967), American football player
Derrick Moore (defensive end) (born 2002), American football player
Derrick Morgan (born 1940), Jamaican musician
Derrick Morgan (American football) (born 1989), American football player
Derrick Morse (born 1985), American football player
Derrick Moss (disambiguation), multiple people
Derrick Murdock (born 1957), American bassist and composer

N
Derrick Ndzimande, South African gospel singer
Derrick Ned (born 1969), American football player
Derrick Ng (born 1987), Canadian badminton player
Derrick Niederman (born 1954), American author
Derrick Nix (born 1990), American basketball player
Derrick Nnadi (born 1996), American football player
Derrick Nsibambi (born 1994), Ugandan footballer
Derrick Nugawela, Sri Lankan army officer
Derrick Nyeko (born 1992), Ugandan politician

O
Derrick Obasohan (born 1981), Nigerian-American basketball player
Derrick O'Connor (1941–2018), Irish theatre and character actor
Derrick Oden (born 1970), American football player
Derrick Oduro (born 1958), Ghanaian politician
Derrick Orone (born 1988), Ugandan politician
Derrick Osaze (born 1993), British boxer
Derrick Otanga (born 1996), Kenyan footballer

P
Derrick Page (born 1961), Jamaican-English cricketer
Derrick Palmer (born 1988/1989), American labor activist
Derrick Parker (born 1957), English footballer
Derrick Patterson (born 1968), Scottish rugby union footballer
Derrick Pearson, American sports announcer
Derrick Pereira (born 1962), Indian footballer
Derrick Peterson (born 1977), American middle-distance runner
Derrick Peynado (born 1960), Jamaican sprinter
Derrick Phelps (born 1972), American basketball player
Derrick Pierce (born 1974), American pornographic actor
Derrick Pitts (born 1955), American astronomer
Derrick Plourde (1971–2005), American punk rock drummer
Derrick Pope (born 1982), American football player
Derrick Pouliot (born 1994), Canadian ice hockey player
Derrick Pumaren, Filipino basketball coach

R
Derrick Ramsey (born 1956), American civil servant
Derrick Ransom (born 1976), American football player
Derrick Richardson (born 1986), American football player
Derrick Roberson (born 1985), American football player
Derrick Robins (1914–2004), English cricketer
Derrick Robinson (born 1987), American baseball player
Derrick Rochester (1940–2016), Jamaican politician
Derrick Rodgers (born 1971), American football player
Derrick Rose (born 1988), American basketball player
Derrick Ross (born 1983), American football player
Derrick Rossi (born 1966), Canadian biologist
Derrick Rostagno (born 1965), American tennis player
Derrick Rowland (born 1959), American basketball player
Derrick Rutledge (born 1961), American celebrity stylist

S
Derrick Sasraku (born 1994), Ghanaian footballer
Derrick Schofield (1928–1999), English rugby league footballer
Derrick Seaver (born 1982), American politician
Derrick Shapande, Zambian footballer
Derrick Shareef (born 1984), American Islamic terrorist
Derrick Sharp (born 1971), American-Israeli professional basketball player
Derrick Shelby (born 1989), American football player
Derrick Shepard (disambiguation), multiple people
Derrick Shepherd (born 1970), American attorney and politician
Derrick Sherwin (1936–2018), British television producer
Derrick Simmons (born 1976), American politician
Derrick Simmons (director), American actor and director
Derrick Smith (disambiguation), multiple people
Derrick Spencer (born 1982), South African footballer
Derrick Spiva (born 1982), American composer and musician
Derrick Starks (born 1970), American musician
Derrick Strait (born 1980), American football player
Derrick Strong (born 1982), American football player
Derrick Sullivan (1930–1983), Welsh footballer
Derrick Summers (born 1988), American football player

T
Derrick Tabb (born 1975), American musician
Derrick Tenai (born 1968), Solomon Islander archer
Derrick Thomas (1967–2000), American football player
Derrick Thomas (agricultural scientist) (1944–2013), British agricultural scientist
Derrick Tomlinson (born 1941), Australian politician
Derrick Tovey (1926–2016), British haematologist 
Derrick Townsel (born 1988), American football player
Derrick Townshend (1944–2013), Zimbabwean cricketer
Derrick Trench (1882–1917), British army officer
Derrick Tribbett (born 1984), American musician and songwriter
Derrick Tseng (born 1954), American film producer
Derrick Tshimanga (born 1988), Belgian-Congolese footballer
Derrick Turnbow (born 1978), American baseball player

V
Derrick Van Dusen (born 19981), American baseball player
Derrick Verner (1907–1975), Irish soldier

W
Derrick Waldroup (born 1962), American wrestler
Derrick Walker (born 1945), British auto racing team owner
Derrick Walker (American football) (born 1967), American football player
Derrick Walser (born 1978), Canadian ice hockey player
Derrick Walters (1932–2000), British priest
Derrick Walton (born 1995), American basketball player
Derrick Ward (born 1980), American football player
Derrick Ward (footballer) (1934–2011), English footballer
Derrick Watkins (born 1983), Australian rugby union footballer
Derrick Watson (born 1966), American judge
Derrick Wells (born 1993), American football player
Derrick Westenra (1853–1921), Irish soldier
Derrick White (disambiguation), multiple people
Derrick Wimbush (born 1980), American football player
Derrick Witherspoon (born 1971), American football player
Derrick Williams (disambiguation), multiple people
Derrick Willies (born 1994), American football player
Derrick Worsley, American actor
Derrick Wright (born 1928), British author
Derrick Wyatt (born 1948), British legal scholar

Z
Derrick Zimmerman (born 1981), American basketball player

Surname
Albert Derrick (disambiguation), multiple people
Butler Derrick (1936–2014), American politician
Chris Derrick (born 1990), American runner
Christopher Derrick (1921–2007), English author
Claud Derrick (1886–1974), American baseball player
Edward Holbrook Derrick (1898–1976), Australian pathologist
Gordon Derrick (born 1968), Antiguan banker
Jantzen Derrick (born 1943), English footballer
John Derrick (disambiguation), multiple people
Johnny Van Derrick (1926–1995), British violinist
Kimberly Derrick (born 1985), American speed skater
Michael Derrick (disambiguation), multiple people
Noel Derrick (1926–2018), Australian ice hockey player
Phyllis Derrick, English lawn bowler
Puss Derrick (1883–1965), American football player
Ron Derrick (born 1933), Australian rules footballer
Samuel Derrick (1724–1769), Irish author
Ted Derrick (1894–1969), Australian rules footballer
Thomas Derrick (disambiguation), multiple people
Tom Derrick (1914–1945), Australian soldier
William B. Derrick (1943–1913), American bishop and missionary
William S. Derrick (1802–1852), American politician
Winston Derrick (1951–2013), Antiguan journalist

See also
Derek, people with the given name of Derek
Derick, people with the given name of Derick, a variation of Derrick
Darrick, people with the given name of Darrick
Derricks (disambiguation), a disambiguation page

English masculine given names
English-language surnames
Surnames from given names